Bear Lodge National Forest is a discontinued entity which has been absorbed into the Black Hills National Forest. It is located in the U.S. in the state of Wyoming, in the north central part of the American mainland. The forest was named for Devils Tower or the "Bear Lodge". On July 1, 1908 the forest was combined with part of Black Hills National Forest to establish Sundance National Forest and the name was discontinued. The lands are presently included in Black Hills National Forest.

References

External links
Forest History Society
Forest History Society:Listing of the National Forests of the United States Text from Davis, Richard C., ed. Encyclopedia of American Forest and Conservation History. New York: Macmillan Publishing Company for the Forest History Society, 1983. Vol. II, pp. 743-788.

Former National Forests of Wyoming